"Love Won't Let Me" is a song written by Jason Deere, Franne Golde and Kasey Livingston. It was first released in 2000 by Brazilian singer Wanessa Camargo for her self-titled debut album in English and Portuguese (retitled "O Amor Não Deixa"), then in 2002 by American country music artist Tammy Cochran. 

Cochran's version was released in December 2002 as the second single from the album Life Happened.  The song reached #31 on the Billboard Hot Country Singles & Tracks chart.

Chart performance

Wanessa Camargo version
The first release recording of the song was in 2000 by Brazilian singer Wanessa Camargo as "O Amor Não Deixa". It was released as her first single, with the original English version "Love Won't Let Me" also appearing on her debut album Wanessa Camargo. The Portuguese lyrics were written by Cesar Lemos. Camargo's English and Portuguese versions of the song were both produced by Jason Deere.

References

2002 singles
2000 songs
Wanessa Camargo songs
Tammy Cochran songs
Songs written by Jason Deere
Songs written by Franne Golde
Song recordings produced by Billy Joe Walker Jr.
Epic Records singles